Carl Hierholzer (2 October 1840 – 13 September 1871) was a German mathematician.

Biography
Hierholzer studied mathematics in Karlsruhe, and he got his Ph.D. from Ruprecht-Karls-Universität Heidelberg in 1865. His Ph.D. advisor was Ludwig Otto Hesse (1811–1874). In 1870 Hierholzer wrote his habilitation about conic sections (title: Ueber Kegelschnitte im Raum) in Karlsruhe, where he later became a Privatdozent.

Hierholzer proved that a connected graph has an Eulerian trail if and only if exactly zero or two of its vertices have an odd degree. This result had been given, with no proof of the 'if' part, by Leonhard Euler in 1736. Hierholzer apparently presented his work to a circle of fellow mathematicians not long before his premature death in 1871. A colleague  then arranged for its posthumous publication in a paper that appeared in 1873.

References 

 C. Hierholzer: Ueber Kegelschnitte im Raume. (Habilitation in Karlsruhe.) Mathematische Annalen II (1870), 564–586.  
 C. Hierholzer: Ueber eine Fläche der vierten Ordnung. Mathematische Annalen IV (1871), 172–180.  
 C. Hierholzer: Über die Möglichkeit, einen Linienzug ohne Wiederholung und ohne Unterbrechung zu umfahren. Mathematische Annalen VI (1873), 30–32.  
 Barnett, Janet Heine Early Writings on Graph Theory: Euler Circuits and The Königsberg Bridge Problem 

1840 births
1871 deaths
Scientists from Freiburg im Breisgau
People from the Grand Duchy of Baden
19th-century German mathematicians